Dincă is a Romanian surname. Notable people with the surname include:

Alexandru Dincă (handballer) (1945–2012), Romanian handballer
Alexandru Dincă (journalist) (1936–1998), Romanian journalist
Ion Dincă (1928–2007), Romanian politician
Mircea Dincă, Romanian chemist
Nicoleta Dincă (born 1988), Romanian handballer

Romanian-language surnames